Houssam Amaanan (born May 12, 1994 in Oujda) is a Moroccan footballer who plays as a midfielder for JS Soualem.

Career
He showed himself after helping MAS Fes win the 2016 Moroccan Throne Cup season against classic teams in Botola pro.Indded, MAS Fes was in the Botola 2 the 2016 season.

He signed for Wydad Casablanca winter of 2017 for a 3 and half years contract.

On 17 July 2022, Amaanan joined Saudi Arabian club Ohod.

On 1 February 2023, Amaanan joined JS Soualem.

Honours
MAS Fes
2016 Moroccan Throne Cup: 2016

References

External links
Houssam Amaanan at Footballdatabase

Moroccan footballers
1994 births
Living people
Association football midfielders
Maghreb de Fès players
Wydad AC players
Chabab Rif Al Hoceima players
Difaâ Hassani El Jadidi players
Ohod Club players
Botola players
Saudi First Division League players
Moroccan expatriate footballers
Expatriate footballers in Saudi Arabia
Moroccan expatriate sportspeople in Saudi Arabia
People from Oujda
21st-century Moroccan people